Small Miracle is a 1934 play by Norman Krasna, presented on Broadway with Joseph Calleia in the featured role. Directed by George Abbott with a single setting designed by Boris Aronson, the three-act melodrama opened September 26, 1934, at the John Golden Theatre, New York. It continued at the 48th Street Theatre November 11, 1934 – January 5, 1935. On February 7, 1935, the play began a run at the El Capitan Theatre in Hollywood, with Calleia, Joseph King and Robert Middlemass reprising their Broadway roles.

It was Krasna's second play, written in the evenings while he was working as a Columbia Pictures contract writer during the day. He adapted the play for the Paramount Pictures film, Four Hours to Kill! (1935).

Cast

 Edward Crandall as Carl Barrett, Jr.
 Joseph Calleia as Tony Mako
 Joseph King as Joseph Taft
 Eva Condon as Ma
 William Wadsworth as Herman
 G. Albert Smith as William S. Johnson
 Myron McCormick as Eddie
 Elspeth Eric as Mae Danish
 Wyrley Birch as Mac Mason
 Fraye Gilbert as Helen
 James Lane as Repair man
 Ilka Chase as Sylvia Temple
 Lucille Strudwick as Anna
 Jean Bellows as Kitty
 Edna Hagan as Twelve-year-old girl
 George Lambert as Stanley Madison
 Violet Barney as Mrs. Madison
 Hitour Gray as Donald Madison
 Allan Hale as George Nelson
 Robert Middlemass as Captain Seaver
 Herbert Duffy as Healy
 Owen Martin as Anderson
 Helen Gardner as First Girl
 Nancy Vane as Second Girl

Reception
The New Yorker called Small Miracle "a very satisfactory melodrama with Joseph Spurin-Calleia as the pleasantest murderer you ever saw."

"George Abbott's talent for accuracy of detail has given this tabloid tale of Times Square passions an uncanny, cumulative fascination," wrote drama critic Brooks Atkinson of The New York Times. Praising Boris Aronson's set design and the performances of Ilka Chase, Myron McCormick, Elspeth Eric, Joseph King and Robert Middlemass, he reserved his highest praise for the featured actor: "Joseph Spurin-Calleia as the prisoner plays with such keen authenticity and such sensitive understatement of emotion that his scenes are enormously moving. Type casting becomes an art when an actor can draw so much pulsing truth out of a character."

The Stage magazine wrote that "there have been few gangsters of the heartbreaking calibre of Joseph Spurin-Calleia's Tony Mako. To this excellent, rather quiet melodrama with its paucity of dead bodies, he gives a sure feeling of impending catastrophe."

Gallery
Photographs of the original Broadway production of Small Miracle appeared in the November 1934 issue of The Stage magazine.

Publication history
Small Miracle was published in 1935 by Samuel French, Inc., with a preface by George Abbott.

Adaptations
Krasna adapted Small Miracle for the Paramount Pictures film, Four Hours to Kill!, released in April 1935 and starring Richard Barthelmess. In 1944 Paramount Pictures announced it would film a new adaptation of Small Miracle, starring Alan Ladd; the project was not realized.

References

External links

 

1934 plays
Broadway plays
American plays adapted into films
Plays set in New York City
Plays by Norman Krasna